Beagle is a breed of dog.

Beagle may also refer to:

Places
 Beagle Channel, a strait separating islands of the Tierra del Fuego archipelago, in extreme southern South America
 Beagle Islands, the Picton, Lennox and Nueva islands, south of the Beagle Channel
 Beagle Gulf, Northern Territory, Australia
 Beagle Island, Tasmania, Australia
 Beagle Island (Antarctica)
 Beagle, Kansas, an unincorporated community, United States
 Beagle, Kentucky, an unincorporated community, United States
 Beagle, Oregon, an unincorporated community, United States
 Beagle (crater), a crater on Mars
 656 Beagle, a minor planet

People
 Jay Beagle (born 1985), Canadian ice hockey player
 Peter S. Beagle (born 1939), American fantasy writer

Other uses
 List of ships named HMS Beagle
 HMS Beagle, the ship that took Darwin on his voyage
 Beagle: In Darwin's wake (Beagle: In het kielzog van Darwin), a Dutch popular science television series
 Beagle (beer), a brand of beer used by Cervecería Fueguina
 Beagle (software), a computer desktop search service
 Beagle Board, a computer produced by Texas Instruments
 Beagle Aircraft, a former British aircraft manufacturer
 Ilyushin Il-28 bomber's NATO reporting name
 Bagle (computer worm), a computer worm also known as Beagle

See also
 Beagle 2, a spacecraft
 Beagle Bay (disambiguation)
 Baggle
 Bagle (disambiguation)